The Monte Carlo Casino, officially named Casino de Monte-Carlo, is a gambling and entertainment complex located in Monaco. It includes a casino, the Opéra de Monte-Carlo, and the office of Les Ballets de Monte-Carlo.

The Casino de Monte-Carlo is owned and operated by the Société des bains de mer de Monaco, a public company in which the Monaco government and the ruling royal family have a majority interest. The company also owns the principal hotels, sports clubs, foodservice establishments, and nightclubs throughout the Principality.

The citizens of Monaco are forbidden to enter the gaming rooms of the casino. The rule banning all Monegasques from gambling or working at the casino was an initiative of Princess Caroline, de facto regent of Monaco, who amended the rules on moral grounds. The idea that the casino was intended only for foreigners was even emphasized in the name of the company that was formed to operate the gambling business, Societe des Bains de Mer et du Cercle des Etrangers.

History 
The idea of opening a gambling casino in Monaco originated with Princess Caroline, a shrewd, business-minded spouse of Prince Florestan. Revenues from the proposed venture were supposed to save the House of Grimaldi from bankruptcy. The ruling family's persistent financial problems became especially acute after the loss of tax revenue from two breakaway towns, Menton and Roquebrune, which declared independence from Monaco in 1848 and refused to pay taxes on olive oil and fruit imposed by the Grimaldis.

In 1854, Charles, Florestan's son and future Prince of Monaco, recruited a team of Frenchmen— writer Albert Aubert and businessman Napoleon Langlois— to devise a development plan and write a prospectus to attract 4 million francs needed to build a spa for the treatment of various diseases, a gambling casino modeled from the Bad Homburg casino, and English-styled villas. Granted the concession of 30 years to operate a bathing establishment and gaming tables, Aubert and Langlois opened the first casino at 14 December 1856 in Villa Bellevu. Intended to be only a temporary location, the building was a modest mansion in La Condamine.

In the late 1850s, Monaco was an unlikely place for a resort to succeed. The lack of roads needed to connect Monaco to Nice and the rest of Europe, and the absence of comfortable accommodations for visitors, as well as the concessionaires' failure to publicize the new resort, resulted in far fewer customers than was originally anticipated. Unable to raise the capital needed to operate the money-losing enterprise, Aubert and Langlois ceded their rights to Frossard de Lilbonne, who in turn passed it to Pierre Auguste Daval in 1857.

During this initial period, the casino had been moved several times, until it finally ended up in the area called Les Spelugues. Construction at this site began on 13 May 1858 to designs of the Parisian architect Gobineau de la Bretonnerie and was completed in 1863. Gobineau de la Bretonnerie also designed the neighboring Hôtel de Paris Monte-Carlo (constructed in 1862).

Although the casino began to make a profit in 1859, Daval was not up to the task. Just like his predecessors, he was incompetent and lacked the ability to bring the gambling enterprise to the scale envisioned by Princess Caroline. Frustrated, she dispatched her private secretary M. Eyneaud to Germany, hoping to recruit François Blanc, a French entrepreneur and operator of the Bad Homburg casino. Blanc declined the offer. It took a lot of time and persuasion on the part of Princess Caroline to convince the Blancs to move to Monaco. Princess Caroline even appealed to Madame Blanc, whom she befriended during her first visit to Bad Homburg, with a suggestion that Monaco's mild climate would be good for Madame Blanc's ill health.

Finally, in 1863 François Blanc agreed to take over Monaco's casino business. To manage the new venture, a company— the Societe des Bains de Mer et du Cercle des Etrangers— was formed with capital of 15 million francs. Among the prominent investors were Charles-Bonaventure-François Theuret, Bishop of Monaco, and Cardinal Pecci, the future Pope Leo XIII. Blanc became the single majority stockholder in the company and received a 50-year concession, which would last until 1913. Blanc used his connections to quickly raise the required capital, and began the massive construction. On Blanc's insistence, the Spelugues area where the gambling complex was located was renamed to make it sound more attractive to casino visitors. A few suggestions were considered, and the name Monte Carlo was chosen in Prince Charles' honor.

In 1878–79, the casino building was transformed and expanded to designs of Jules Dutrou (1819–1885) and Charles Garnier, the architect who had designed the Paris opera house now known as the Palais Garnier. François Blanc knew Garnier because Blanc had provided a loan of at least 4.9 million gold francs to the cash-strapped government of the French Third Republic, so that the opera house, which had been started in 1861, could be completed. It had finally opened in 1875. The alterations to the Casino de Monte Carlo included the addition of a concert hall (designed by Garnier and later named the Salle Garnier), located on the side of the casino facing the sea, and the redesign and expansion of the gaming rooms and public spaces, mostly carried out by Dutrou on the side of the casino facing the Place du Casino, where the Hôtel de Paris Monte-Carlo and the Café de Paris were also located.

In 1880–81, the casino was expanded again, to the east of Dutrou's Moorish Room, by the addition of the Trente-et-Quarante Gaming Room, also designed by Garnier. Subsequent additions and expansions, and the remodeling of the Trente-et-Quarante Gaming Room into the Salle des Américains, have mostly obliterated Garnier's contributions to this part of the casino, except for some ceiling decorations.  In 1898–99, the Salle Garnier was remodeled by architect Henri Schmit, primarily in the stage area, so that it would be more suitable for opera and ballet performances. However, much of Garnier's original facade and the interior design of the auditorium itself remain intact. Despite all of the later additions and modifications, the casino still has a distinctly Beaux Arts style.

In 1921, the first Women’s Olympiad was held at the casino gardens.

Until recently, the Casino de Monte-Carlo has been the primary source of income for the House of Grimaldi and the Monegasque economy.

Facilities
The casino has facilities to play a variety of games which include:

 Different kinds of roulette
 Stud poker
 Blackjack
 Trente et Quarante
 Craps
 Baccarat
 Video poker
 Slot machines

1913 gambler's fallacy
The most famous example of the gambler's fallacy occurred in a game of roulette at the Casino de Monte-Carlo in the summer of 1913, when the ball fell in black 26 times in a row, an extremely uncommon occurrence. Gamblers lost millions of francs betting against black, reasoning incorrectly that the streak was causing an "imbalance" in the randomness of the wheel, and that it had to be followed by a long streak of red.

Breaking the bank 
 In 1873, Joseph Jagger gained the casino great publicity by "breaking the bank at Monte Carlo" by discovering and capitalizing on a bias in one of the casino's roulette wheels. Technically, the bank in this sense was the money kept on the table by the croupier. According to an article in The Times in the late 19th century, it was thus possible to "break the bank" several times. The 1892 song "The Man Who Broke the Bank at Monte Carlo", made famous by Charles Coborn, was probably inspired by the exploits of Charles Wells, who "broke the bank" on many occasions on the first two of his three trips.
 According to the book Busting Vegas by Ben Mezrich, a team of blackjack players recruited from the Massachusetts Institute of Technology by team-leader Victor Cassius and Semyon Dukach attempted to break the bank at Monte Carlo with the assistance of a team-play-based system. The book describes how the management of Monte Carlo responded to the success of the team. According to Semyon the account in Busting Vegas is accurate aside from the fact that the team was made up of himself, Andy Bloch and another player he refers to as "Katie".

In popular culture 
 James Bond, a fictional British spy, is often associated with the Casino de Monte-Carlo. 
 Monaco and its casino were the locations for a number of James Bond movies, including Never Say Never Again and GoldenEye, as well as for the "Casino Royale" episode of CBS's Climax! television show.
 The casino was a filming location for the music video for Kylie Minogue’s 2000 single "On a Night Like This".
 The casino served as a filming location for the 2004 film Ocean's Twelve.
 The casino makes an appearance in Condorman, The Castle of Cagliostro and Madagascar 3: Europe's Most Wanted.

Other mentions 
 The Monte Carlo method, a computational approach which relies on repeated random sampling to solve difficult numerical problems, was named after the Casino de Monte-Carlo by physicist Nicholas Metropolis.
 CASINO, a quantum Monte Carlo method
 Casino, a portion of the Circuit de Monaco of the Monaco Grand Prix

Gallery

See also
 Casino Gardens and Terraces

References
Notes

Sources
 Bonillo, Jean-Lucien, et al. (2004). Charles Garnier and Gustave Eiffel on the French and Italian Rivieras: The Dream of Reason (in English and French). Marseilles: Editions Imbernon. .
 Bouvier, Béatrice (2004). "Inventaires" in Bonillo et al. 2004, pp. 186–205.
 Folli, Andrea; Merello, Gisella (2004). "The Splendour of the Garnier Rooms at the Monte Carlo Casino" in Bonillo et al. 2004, pp. 112–137.
 Denby, Elaine (2004). Grand Hotels: Reality and Illusion. London: Reaktion Books. .

External links 

1879 establishments in Monaco
Art Nouveau architecture in Monaco
Casinos completed in the 19th century
Casinos in Monaco
Monte Carlo
Second Empire architecture
Tourist attractions in Monaco
Charles Garnier buildings